The inferior lateral cutaneous nerve of arm is a nerve found in humans and other animals. It is also called the inferior lateral brachial cutaneous nerve. It is a branch of the radial nerve that provides sensory and vasomotor innervation to the lower, lateral aspect of the arm.

See also
Superior lateral cutaneous nerve of arm (a branch of the axillary nerve)
Lateral cutaneous nerve of forearm (a continuation of the musculocutaneous nerve)
Posterior cutaneous nerve of arm (another branch of the radial nerve)

References

Nerves of the upper limb